, literally "Ride together", or "Car pool" but can also be read as "love ride", is a popular television program that runs Monday evenings from 11 pm in Japan on Fuji TV. It debuted on October 11, 1999.  The show originally ended on March 23, 2009 but returned under the name "Ainori 2" on December 25, 2010, running through April 30, 2011. 

Ainori was revived by Fuji TV and Netflix beginning with Asian Journey, which was first broadcast on the streaming platform in November 2017 and on Fuji TV in January 2018. Both media outlets also aired the second season of Asian Journey as well as the first season of African Journey, which was available on Netflix in late 2019 and on Fuji TV in early 2020.

Description 

Ainori is a reality program where seven young men and women travel the world riding a pink bus.  The program is reminiscent of a travelogue; as of December 2008, the show has followed the bus across 90 countries as participants explore both famous tourist attractions and more off-the-beaten-path places.  The participants are led across each country by a native who serves as tour guide, bus driver, and friend.  Upon reaching the border with another country, the bus stops and participants head out to their next destination country to meet their new tour guide and get into their new bus.

The show's twist is that the participants are each young, single people whose goal is to find love with another participant and return to Japan as a couple.  When a participant has decided they like someone else, they ask the driver for a ticket back to Japan. They then declare their love to the object of their affection, and ask that the two return to Japan together. After a night's consideration, the person who received the love declaration can either answer with a kiss, after which both participants leave the bus for Japan.  Otherwise, the jilted participant is left to return to Japan alone.  Besides the love declaration, participants are forbidden from talking openly about their love interests with other participants, but inform the TV audience of their feelings through diaries and confessions to the camera (shot when no other participants are present).

After people leave the bus, new people are added to the program, to keep the total at 7 members. They are seen on the side of the road with a painted cardboard sign (appearing to be hitchhikers) and brought aboard after a self-introduction.

The First Lap Around the World ended in May, 2003, and the Second Lap ended in March, 2007. After that, the bus visits the countries which has never been visited on the show, without the route. The 400th episode was aired on May 5, 2008.

As of March, 2009, 44 couples have found love through the program, and there have been 8 marriages (though one couple has divorced).  On March 1, 2005, the first "Ainori Baby" was born, and as of mid-2008 there have been 4 babies born in total.

Countries visited

The First Lap 

 *1 : Paolo is a native person who participants met in the youth hostel in Italy. He could speak Japanese because he had stayed in Japan for one year.
 *2 : Once Midori had been jilted by Kin-chan, and been back to Japan from Vietnam. After that, she received a letter from him, and visited Thailand to meet him again there.
 *3 : Once Hisashi had been jilted by Mariko, and been back to Japan. But Mariko gave up the trip to meet Hisashi again in Japan.

The Second Lap 

 *1 : Michele, Pendo, and Andy are native persons. Michele was a special participant as the commemoration of the Second Lap. Pendo and Andy took part in the trip during a single episode.
 *2 : In the episode #315, Outlaw gave up the trip because of the mistake by the staff, and Goki also did. But in the episode #317, they reported that they had met again in Japan and had started to love each other. Although they are not counted as an official couple of the program.
 *3 : Once MIE had been jilted by Susan, and been back to Japan from Hungary. But in Switzerland Susan gave up the trip and returned to Japan to meet her again.

The Indefinite Travel (after the Second Lap)

Ainori 2

Ainori: Asian Journey (Netflix) 

Ainori: Asian Journey Season 2 (Netflix)

Ainori: African Journey (Netflix)

Memorable incidents 

Although relationships between staff and participants are forbidden, some incidents involving staff have occurred:

 In South Africa, a female participant fell in love with the tour guide, and when the bus stopped at the country's border (and she realized she'd never get to see him again) she begged the producers to let her confess her love.  She did and the two became a couple.
 In spring of 2006, a female participant got intimate with the audio technician (even though the two had never talked, and the audio technician had a girlfriend).  This incident resulted in the female participant, a male participant who was in love with her, the audio technician, and a cameraman all returning to Japan.

Other memorable incidents include:

 In Costa Rica, three male participants were arrested by the police for exposing their buttocks to children. After five hours they were released by the staff's persuasion.
 After leaving Costa Rica, the program avoided Nicaragua because of insecurity of the political condition, and visited Jamaica. But the Nicaraguan ambassador in Japan made a protest against the program. So the program visited Nicaragua after leaving Fiji. The participants were welcomed as the sightseeing goodwill ambassadors.
 A female participant developed a physical ailment for which the doctor prohibited her from riding on the bus, or any other prolonged sitting position. Because of this, the only solution seemed that she would have to be sent home, and be eliminated from the show. However, the group came to the decision that they would ditch the bus, and walk for the rest of the trip (while carrying around all of their baggage), just so the girl could remain with them.
 In January 2006, a female participant broke down in tears and explained that three days before leaving for her Ainori trip, a male friend who she had long been harboring feelings for had finally confessed his love for her. She explained that she missed him terribly, could not get him out of her mind, and would likely not find love with any of the participants on Ainori, and thus left the show.
 In the summer of 2006, during a break in shooting when participants were on vacation back home in Japan, a female participant discovered that the male participant that she was in love with had a girlfriend in Japan, and indeed had had a girlfriend when he left for his world trip (strictly against the rules of Ainori). After all the participants were back in Europe shooting the show, the man was confronted, finally confessed the truth to his bus-mates, and left the show to return to Japan.

Fundraising 

Since April 2004, the program started the fundraising campaign called Ainori Bokin (Ainori Fundraising). This is a donation for poor countries visited in the program. The money has been mainly used for children living in these countries, and the schools called Ainori Gakko (Ainori School) have been built.

Commentators 

 Masami Hisamoto – October 11, 1999 – 2006
 Koji Imada – October 11, 1999 – 2006
 Haruhiko Katō – October 11, 1999 – March 20, 2006
 Eiji Wentz – April 10, 2006 – 2011
 Becky – October 2017 – present
 Mayuko Kawakita – October 2017 – 2018
 Audrey – October 2017 – 2018
 Shimon Okura – October 2017 – 2018
 Asako Ito – November 2018 – July 2019
 Natsuna Watanabe – November 2018 – July 2019
 Karina Maruyama – January 2020 – present
 Ryo Kato – January 2020 – present
 Kouhei Takeda – January 2020 – present

Trivia 

 To help prevent relationships between the staff and the participants, only staff members who are married or are already involved are chosen to work on the show.
 Hit tunes such as ELT's "Fragile", Glay's "Way of Difference", and I WiSH's "ashita e no tobira" are used as the main theme music
 The "Love Wagon", as the bus is nicknamed, is typically a Toyota High-Ace, painted pink with Ainori logos on it.  However, when the bus breaks down, or local traffic regulations prevent the love wagon from being used, a locally purchased Japanese van painted in the same way will often be substituted.
 Although typically the couples are "born" on their world trip, in the summer of 2006, two separate couples (Goki/Outlaw and MIE/Susan) were formed after the participants returned to Japan and realized their feelings for each other there, and in February 2007, an "Ainori news special" told the story of another couple (Hide/Kayo) who got together after returning to Japan.

International versions

Vietnam 
The Vietnamese version is called "Hành trình kết nối những trái tim" ("Journey to match hearts"), or "Love bus", was broadcast in December 2008, becoming a high rated show of Ho Chi Minh City and Hanoi Television. It is originally aired every Tuesday at 10PM.

References

External links

 Official Ainori website 
 English-language recaps of each episode

Japanese reality television series
1999 Japanese television series debuts
1990s Japanese television series
2000s Japanese television series
2010s Japanese television series
2020s Japanese television series
Fuji TV original programming
Japanese-language Netflix original programming
Adventure travel